Gyömöre is a village in Győr-Moson-Sopron county, Hungary. It is around 20 km south of Győr.

Notable residents
 László Háry (1890-1953), major general, aviator and a Commander of the First Independent Hungarian Air Force
 Chaim Sofer (1821-1886), Hungarian rabbi

External links 
 Street map 

Populated places in Győr-Moson-Sopron County